Misagh Medina Bahadoran (born January 10, 1987) is a Filipino footballer who plays as a winger or forward for Maharlika Manila in the Philippines Football League and the Philippines national team. He has also played for the Philippines national futsal team.

Early life and education
Bahadoran's father, Mostafa, is Iranian and his mother is Kapampangan Filipino.  He is the third of seven children. He was raised in Tehran, Iran At age 7, Bahadoran started to play football and dreamed to be a professional footballer. However, he was discouraged from playing football by his father after his eldest brother, a professional footballer, had a career-ending injury. However Bahadoran continued playing football in secret.

Bahadoran was sent to Philippines by his father in 2004 to finish his high school studies in Pampanga. The relative lack of awareness on football in the Philippines limited Bahadoran's options in getting involved in the sport. When Bahadoran entered Centro Escolar University in Manila, he and his foreign classmate successfully petitioned the school administration to convert a basketball court into a futsal field.

At the end of the 2010–11 school year, Bahadoran graduated from Centro Escolar University in Manila, with a degree in Dentistry; he is currently a qualified dentist with his own practice.

Club career

Pasargad
Bahadoran first participated at the United Football League in 2009 as a player for Pasargad.

Kaya
In 2010, he then later moved to Kaya.

Global Cebu
In 2011, he was asked to try out for the Tokyo Verdy, after failing his try out for the Japanese club, he joined United Football League (UFL) club Global.  Bahadoran helped Global win three UFL league titles, a UFL Cup title, and a UFL FA Cup title.

He remained with Global, when the club renamed itself as Global Cebu and moved to the Philippines Football League (PFL).

Perak FA
Bahadoran was set to transfer to Kelantan FA but later decided to sign up with Perak TBG F.C. instead on December 28, 2017. Bahadoran's contract was terminated with the Malaysia Super League club in May 2018 after a short stint under Perak head coach Mehmet Durakovic.

Brief return to Global and joining Maharlika
In February 2020, Bahadoran returned to Global ahead of the 2020 PFL season. Bahadoran signed the lowest deal in his career to help a club he had played for before, but he and other players had to deal with issues relating to unpaid wages and uncertainties over club's management.

In August 2020, Bahadoran has hinted possibilities of playing for Maharlika, a club aspiring to enter the PFL in the 2020 season, which had been postponed due to the COVID-19 pandemic, at earliest. By the end of the month, Bahadoran has formalized his move to the club, which was granted provisional license to play in the PFL on September 1.

International career
Bahadoran first got called up to the Philippines squad in 2007, but his father urged him not to play for the team due to conflicts with his studies.  After graduating from university in 2011, his father allowed him to pursue football and was again called up to the national team.  He was eventually named in the final squad for the 2014 FIFA World Cup qualification first round against Sri Lanka.  However, over the two-legged match, he was not able to get his debut.  As the Philippines advanced to the second round qualifiers against Kuwait, he made his debut in the first-leg, coming on as a substitute for Ángel Guirado in the second minute of second half stoppage time in a 3–0 defeat.  In the second-leg, he came on as an 80th-minute substitute for Guirado but was not able to help the Philippines make a comeback as they lost 2–1.

On 11 June 2015, he scored his first international goal in a 2–1 win for the 2018 FIFA World Cup qualification second round against Bahrain. Five days later, he scored the Philippines' first goal in a 2–0 win over Yemen.

International goals

Personal life
Since December 2015 Bahadoran had been dating Filipina actress and model Sam Pinto. The couple split in 2018.

In November 2016, Bahadoran still hadn't practiced dentistry due to his focusing on his football career, though he was planning to launch his dental clinic in December. As of the same month, he also runs a food joint called MelMac Peri Peri Express.

Bahadoran is also the owner of Global Elite Dental Clinic in Makati.

Futsal
During his college years, Bahadoran was widely involved futsal rather than football so he could manage his studies better. In 2006, Bahadoran started to play for the Philippines national futsal team.

7s football
In early 2019, Bahadoran joined Manila side Laro FC which played seven-a-side football in the 7's Football League that is known for having had players such as Anton del Rosario, Daniel Matsunaga, Alexander Borromeo, and Simon Greatwich.

Outside football

Sponsorship
Bahadoran is outfitted by American sportswear supplier Nike.

Career statistics

Club

1Including AFC Champions League, AFC Cup and AFC President's Cup

International

International goals
Scores and results list the Philippines' goal tally first.

Honours

Club
Global
UFL Division 1: 2012; Runner-up 2013

International
AFC Challenge Cup: Third 2012
Philippine Peace Cup: 2012, 2013

References

External links
 
 

1987 births
Living people
Filipino people of Iranian descent
Citizens of the Philippines through descent
People from Mabalacat
Filipino footballers
Filipino expatriate footballers
Philippines international footballers
Sportspeople from Pampanga
Association football forwards
Association football wingers
Global Makati F.C. players
Pasargad F.C. players
Kaya F.C. players
Perak F.C. players
Philippines Football League players
Centro Escolar University alumni
Filipino men's futsal players
Iranian people of Filipino descent
Kapampangan people
Iranian expatriate footballers
Iranian footballers
Iranian male models
Filipino male models
Expatriate footballers in Malaysia
Sportspeople of Iranian descent
Maharlika F.C. players
Outfield association footballers who played in goal